Peter Valentine Purcell Gilpin (1858 - 1928) was a British racehorse trainer. He was Champion Trainer in 1904 and his most notable winner was the filly Pretty Polly who won the Fillies Triple Crown in 1904. He also trained Comrade, the winner of the inaugural Prix de l'Arc de Triomphe in 1920.

Arms

References 

British racehorse trainers
1858 births
1928 deaths